Amurodytes is a genus of predaceous diving beetles in the family Dytiscidae. There is one described species in Amurodytes, A. belovi, found in the Palearctic.

References

Further reading

 
 
 

Dytiscidae